Ballabhpurer Roopkotha is a 2022 Indian Bengali language supernatural comedy drama film directed by Anirban Bhattacharya in his feature directorial debut, based on the 1954 eponymous play by Badal Sarkar. It follows a debt-laden royal scion as he tries to pay off creditors by selling his ancestral palace, while trying to hide a potentially deal-breaking secret. The plot was originally inspired by the film The Ghost Goes West by René Clair. 

The film was released on 25 October 2022 under the banner of Shree Venkatesh Films. It received strongly positive reviews,  and was a box office success.

Plot
In 1961, Ray Bahadur Bhupati Ray, the King of Ballabhpur village, is deep in debt. His only material asset is his crumbling 400-year-old ancestral palace. Bhupati wants to move to Kolkata and start a dental clinic, and he tries to sell the palace to pay off his debts.

As a potential buyer, businessman Mr. Haldar, informs him that he will come over to take a look at the property. Bhupati and his faithful butler, Monohar set about to give the house a new look. They seek help from three of Bhupati's local creditors, Saha, Srinath and Paban. Bhupati's college friend, Sanjib becomes a part of the act by playing the estate's dewan.

Mr Haldar arrives that night with his wife Sapna and daughter Chhandaa. Contrary to Bhupati's expectations, he is highly impressed by the historic heritage and the aristocratic flavour of the household. Haldar immediately signs him a cheque for the property. Halder is willing to offer almost more than double the amount but Bhupati refuses to take more money than he requires. Chhandaa and Bhupati instantly feel attracted to each other. As the Haldars leave after dinner, Bhupati reveals a big secret to Sanjib, one that he has kept from the buyers- Every night after 11 pm, the ghost of Raghupati, Bhupati's ancestor wanders around the palace. He further reveals that Raghupati is trapped in the mansion because of a curse. Raghu Da, as he calls him, can only get rid of the curse by forcing his rivals, the descendants of the Bhuiyas  (royals) of Ballabhpur's rival kingdom Pratapgarh, to surrender and apologize. Sanjib doesn't believe him but is frightened by Raghu's laughter ringing out as the clock strikes 11.

However, the Haldars return to the palace because their car breaks down on their way back. Bhupati and Sanjib panic and get anxious while Monohar makes modest arrangements for their guests' night stay. Bhupati tries to calm Raghu, but the latter continues his manic laughter and starts reciting verses or Sanskrit shloks. Chhandaa is mesmerized by the recitation, especially after the womanising Raghu's ghost recites from Kalidas to her. But she mistakes him for Bhupati since both of them look identical. Sapna is furious to see 'Bhupati' flirting with her daughter late at night, and forces her husband to cancel the deal. When she has a go at Bhupati, he takes the blame. Then he confesses the truth to a confused Mr Haldar in private. Mr Halder is overjoyed to learn about the ghost and he proposes to quadruple the amount paid if Bhupati can prove the ghost's presence to his wife the next time. Sapna agrees to this. Chhandaa is offended by Bhupati's meekness in accepting blame when there was none. She further accuses him of being a coward. 

The very next day, a new prospective buyer appears at the door. Mr Haldar barges in with his family and identifies the man as Mr Chowdhury, his school friend, competitor and fellow aficionado of heritage palaces. Mr Chowdhury ridicules both Mr Haldar and Bhupati regarding the history of the palace and ends up revealing himself as a descendant of the Pratapgarh royals. An excited Bhupati summons Raghu who arrives and threatens Mr Chowdhury with a sword. When his bullets prove no match for Raghu, Mr Chowdhury finally kneels down and begs forgiveness. Raghu is released from his curse and disappears. All the misunderstandings are settled. Sapna apologizes and proposes Chhandaa and Bhupati get married, which they readily agree to. The film ends with the newly-married couple discussing life when they hear Raghu's voice again.

Cast
 Satyam Bhattacharya as Bhupati / Raghupati / Ramapati (Raghupati's father)
 Surangana Bandyopadhyay as Chhandaa
 Debraj Bhattacharya as Sanjib Basu
 Shyamal Chakraborty as Monohar / Harihar / Monohari
 Sandip Bhattacharya as Mr. B.P. Halder
 Jhulan Bhattacharya as Swapna
 Kripabindu Chowdhury as Saha
 Sumanta Roy as Paban
 Surajit Sarkar as Srinath
 Shyamal Sarkar as Mr. Chowdhury
 Naren Bhattacharjee as the boatman
 Nitai as Bohurupi Balaai

Reception

Box office 
Ballabhpurer Roopkatha emerged as a financial success. The film is estimated to have made ₹5 crore at the box office.

Critical response 
The film received strongly positive reviews, with multiple critics praising the film and highlighting its originality, the merging of humour, romance and horror, performances of the cast, direction and cinematography. Writing for The Telegraph, Shantanu Ray Chaudhuri called it "an important film as far as Bengali cinema is concerned, which is going through what is without a doubt its most barren phase in years, both creatively and commercially". The Citizen's Shoma A Chatterji called the film "perhaps the best thing to have happened to Bengali cinema in a long, long time", terming it the best Bengali film of 2022.

Music

References

2022 films
Bengali-language Indian films
2022 comedy horror films
Indian comedy horror films
Films set in country houses
2020s Bengali-language films
Indian romantic comedy films
Indian films based on plays

External links